This is a list of utility cooperatives.

Canada

Energy
 Ag Energy Co-operative
 Blue Mountain Power Co-op
 Lac La Biche Gas Co-Op 
 SPARK: Green Energy Alberta

Telecommunications 
 Access Communications Co-operative (Saskatchewan)
 Brooke Telecom Co-operative (Ontario)
 CCAP (Coopérative de câblodistribution de l’arrière-pays) (Quebec)
 CoopTel (Quebec)
 Gosfield North Communications Co-operative (Ontario)
 Hay Communications Co-Operative (Ontario)
 Hurontel Telecommunications Co-operative (Ontario)
 Lansdowne Rural Telephone Company (Ontario)
 Mornington Communications Co-operative (Ontario) 
 Quadro Communications Co-operative (Ontario)
 Tuckersmith Communications Co-operative (Ontario)
 Westman Communications Group (Manitoba)

Czech Republic
 CoopMobile (mobile telephony service from Coop Skupina)

Denmark
 coop mobil (on Wikipedia Danmark. Mobile telephony service from Coop Danmark)

France
 Enercoop (on Wikipedia Français)

Italy
 CoopVoce (on Wikipedia Italia; mobile telephony service from Coop Italia)

Japan
 Ina Cable Broadcasting Agricultural Cooperative (formerly Ina AINET) is a provider of DSL broadband and cable TV services, and is owned by the Ina, Nagano Prefecture subsidiary of Japan Agricultural Cooperatives (JA). It resells the JANIS service. (article on Wikipedia Japanese: Ina Cable)
 JANIS is a DSL broadband, cable TV and IP Phone provider, run by (Wikipedia Japanese: Nagano Cooperative Computing), a subsidiary of Japan Agricultural Cooperatives (JA). Despite the name, it sells to individuals and organizations.

Philippines
 Batangas II Electric Cooperative, Inc.
 Central Negros Electric Cooperative

Switzerland
 CoopMobile Abo (post-paid mobile telephony service from Coop)
 CoopMobile Prix Garantie (pre-paid mobile telephony service from Coop)
 M-Budget (mobile telephony service from Migros)

United Kingdom
 Co-operative Energy
 The Phone Co-op

United States

Electric 

 A&N Electric Cooperative
 Adams-Columbia Electric Cooperative
 Adams Electric Cooperative
 Adams Rural Electric Cooperative (West Union, Ohio)
 Albemarle Electric Membership Corporation
 Allegheny Electric Cooperative
 Arizona G&T Cooperatives
 Arkansas Valley Electric Cooperative
 Ashley-Chicot Electric Cooperative
 Bailey County Electric Cooperative Association
 Bandera Electric Cooperative
 BARC Electric Cooperative
 Bartlett Electric Cooperative
 Basin Electric Power Cooperative
 Beartooth Electric Cooperative
 Bedford Rural Electric Cooperative
 Big Country Electric Cooperative
 Blue Ridge Energy
 Bluebonnet Electric Cooperative
 Bowie-Cass Electric Cooperative
 Brazos Electric Power Cooperative
 Brunswick Electric Membership Corporation
 Buckeye Rural Electric Cooperative (Willow Wood, Ohio)
 Burlington Electric Department
 Butler Rural Electric Cooperative (Oxford, Ohio)
 C&L Electric Cooperative
 Cape Hatteras Electric Cooperative
 Capital Electric Cooperative
 Carroll Electric Cooperative
 Carroll Electric Cooperative (Carrollton, Ohio)
 Carteret-Craven Electric Cooperative
 Cass County Electric Cooperative
 Cavalier Rural Electric Cooperative
 Central Alabama Electric Cooperative
 Central Electric Cooperative
 Central Electric Membership Corporation
 Central Florida Electric Cooperative
 Central Missouri Electric Cooperative
 Central Power Electric Cooperative
 Central Rural Electric Cooperative
 Central Texas Electric Cooperative
 Cherokee County Electric Cooperative
 Choctawhatchee Electric Cooperative
 Choptank Electric Cooperative
 City Utilities of Springfield
 Claverack Rural Electric Cooperative
 Clay County Electric Cooperative
 Clay Electric Cooperative (Florida) (Keystone Heights, Florida)
 Clay Electric Co-operative (Illinois) (Flora, Illinois)
 Coleman County Electric Cooperative
 Comanche Electric Cooperative
 Community Electric Cooperative
 Concho Valley Electric Cooperative
 Connexus Energy
 Consolidated Cooperative (Mt. Gilead, Ohio)
 Cooperativa Hidroeléctrica de la Montaña (Puerto Rico)
 CoServ Electric
 Craig-Botetourt Electric Cooperative
 Craighead Electric Cooperative
 Dairyland Power Cooperative (LaCrosse, Wisconsin)
 Dakota Valley Electric Cooperative
 Darke Rural Electric Cooperative (Greenville, Ohio)
 Deaf Smith Electric Cooperative
 Deep East Texas Electric Cooperative
 Delaware Electric Cooperative
 East Central Electric Cooperative (northeast Oklahoma)
 Edgecombe-Martin County Electric Membership Corporation
 EnergyUnited
 Escambia River Electric Cooperative
 Fannin County Electric Cooperative
 Farmers Electric Cooperative (Arkansas)
 Farmers Electric Cooperative (Texas)
 Fayette Electric Cooperative
 Firelands Electric Cooperative (New London, Ohio)
 First Electric Cooperative (Arkansas)
 Flathead Electric Cooperative (Montana)
Flint Energies
 Florida Keys Electric Cooperative
 Fort Belknap Electric Cooperative
 Four County Electric Membership Corporation
 French Broad Electric Membership Corporation
 Glades Electric Cooperative
 Grayson-Collin Electric Cooperative
 Great Lakes Energy Cooperative (Boyne City, Michigan)
 Great River Energy
 Greenbelt Electric Cooperative
 Guernsey-Muskingum Electric Cooperative (New Concord, Ohio)
 Gulf Coast Electric Cooperative
 Guadalupe Valley Telephone Cooperative
 Halifax Electric Membership Corporation
 Hancock-Wood Electric Cooperative (North Baltimore, Ohio)
 Harrison Rural Electrification (West Virginia) (Clarksburg, West Virginia)
 Haywood Electric Membership Corporation
 HILCO Electric Cooperative
 Holmes-Wayne Electric Cooperative (Millersburg, Ohio)
 HomeWorks Tri-County Electric Cooperative (Blanchard, Michigan)
 Isle au Haut Electric Power Company
 Jemez Mountains Electric Cooperative
 Jones-Onslow Electric Membership Corporation
 Kauaʻi Island Utility Cooperative
 KEM Electric Cooperative
 Lee County Electric Cooperative
 Logan County Electric Cooperative (Bellefontaine, Ohio)
 Lorain-Medina Rural Electric Cooperative (Wellington, Ohio)
 Lumbee River Electric Membership Corporation
 Lyntegar Electric Cooperative, Inc.
 McKenzie Electric Cooperative
 McLean Electric Cooperative
 Mecklenburg Electric Cooperative
 Meriwether Lewis Electric Cooperative
 Mid-Ohio Energy Cooperative (Kenton, Ohio)
 Midwest Electric Cooperative (St. Marys, Ohio)
 Midwest Energy & Communications (Adrian, Michigan)
 Minnkota Power Cooperative
 Mississippi County Electric Cooperative
 Mor-Gran-Sou Electric Cooperative
 Navopache Electric Cooperative
 New Enterprise Rural Electric Cooperative
 NineStar Connect (formerly Central Indiana Power)
 Nodak Electric Cooperative
 North Arkansas Electric Cooperative
 North Carolina Electric Membership Corporation
 North Central Electric Cooperative (Bottineau, North Dakota)
 North Central Electric Cooperative (Ohio) (Attica, Ohio)
 North Western Electric Cooperative (Bryan, Ohio)
 Northern Electric Cooperative 
 Northern Neck Electric Cooperative
 Northern Plains Electric Cooperative
 Northeastern Rural Electric Membership Cooperative (Columbia City, Indiana)
 Ohio's Electric Cooperatives
 Northern Virginia Electrical Cooperative
 Northwestern Rural Electric Cooperative (Cambridge Springs, Pennsylvania)
 Ohio's Electric Cooperatives
 Okefenoke Rural Electric Membership Corporation
 Old Dominion Electric Cooperative
 Oliver-Mercer Electric Cooperative
 Oregon Trail Electric Cooperative
 Ouachita Electric Cooperative
 Ozarks Electric Cooperative
 Paulding-Putnam Electric Cooperative (Paulding, Ohio)
 Peace River Electric Cooperative
 Pedernales Electric Cooperative
 Pee Dee Electric Membership Corporation
 PenTex Energy
 Petit Jean Electric Cooperative
 Piedmont Electric Membership Corporation
 Pioneer Electric Cooperative (Urbana, Ohio)
 Pitt & Greene Electric Membership Corporation
 PowerSouth Energy Cooperative
 Presque Isle Electric & Gas (Onaway, MI)
 Prince George Electric Cooperative
 Randolph Electric Membership Corporation
 Rappahannock Electric Cooperative
 REA Energy Cooperative
 Rich Mountain Electric Cooperative
 Richland Electric Cooperative
 Roanoke Electric Cooperative
 Rutherford Electric Membership Corporation
 Sawnee EMC
 Seminole Electric Cooperative
 Shenandoah Valley Electric Cooperative
 Somerset Rural Electric Cooperative
 South Central Arkansas Electric Cooperative
 South Central Power (Lancaster, Ohio)
 South River Electric Membership Corporation
 Southern Maryland Electric Cooperative
 Southside Electric Cooperative
 Southwest Arkansas Electric Cooperative
 Sullivan County Rural Electric Cooperative
 Sumter Electric Cooperative
 Surry-Yadkin Electric Membership Corporation
 Sussex Rural Electric Cooperative
 Suwannee Valley Electric Cooperative
 Talquin Electric Cooperative
 The Energy Cooperative (Newark, Ohio)
 The Frontier Power Company (Coshocton, Ohio)
 Tideland Electric Membership Corporation
 Touchstone Energy
 Tricounty Rural Electric Cooperative (Malinta, Ohio)
 Tri-County Electric Membership Corporation
 Tri-County Electric Cooperative
 Tri-County Rural Electric Cooperative
 Union Power Cooperative
 Union Rural Electric Cooperative (Marysville, Ohio)
 United Electric Cooperative
 Valley Rural Electric Cooperative
 Verendrye Electric Cooperative
 Vermont Electric Cooperative
 Vernon Electric Cooperative (Vernon County, Wisconsin)
 Wabash Valley Power Association
 Wake Electric Membership Corporation
 Warren Electric Cooperative
 Washington Electric Cooperative (Marietta, Ohio)
 West Florida Electric Cooperative
 Wharton County Electric Cooperative (El Campo, Texas) 
 Wiregrass Electric Cooperative (Hartford, Alabama) 
 Withlacoochee River Electric Cooperative (Dade City, Florida) 
 Wolverine Power Supply Cooperative (Cadillac, Michigan) 
 Woodruff Electric Cooperative (Forrest City, Arkansas)

Telecommunications

Water
 L.A. Water Cooperative - Gaston, Oregon 
 O'Connor Tract Co-Operative Water Company - Menlo Park, California
 Palo Alto Park Mutual Water Company - East Palo Alto, California

See also
 List of co-operative federations
 List of cooperatives
 List of energy cooperatives
 List of worker cooperatives
 National Rural Electric Cooperative Association

References

 
Lists of cooperatives